Pokhari may refer to:

Pokhari, Sagarmatha, Nepal
Pokhari, Seti, Nepal